Irumbu Pookkal is a 1991 Tamil-language crime film directed by G. M. Kumar. The film stars Karthik and Pallavi. It was released on 16 February 1991.

Plot 

A military officer, who lost his leg in the war, was back to his village. His wife committed suicide when she received the letter of his presumed death. His children, his cousin and he asked for a signature from the village politician for receiving a pension but the corrupted politician refused until his cousin accepted to spend a night with him. His cousin then committed suicide and he was sent to jail. There, the police officers killed him. His son Dharma took revenge on the police officer by killing him. He was then sent to jail and grew up there.

Dharma becomes a famous singer in jail while his sister becomes a reporter. K. Balasubramaniyam, an infamous politician, tries to become a minister. His party weakness was the lack of women voters. So he arranges a meeting with his female members, he then manages to kill and rape them by the ruling party's supporters. He then publicly-accused the ruling party for committing this crime. Dharma's sister was also raped during the meeting. Thereafter, Balasubramaniyam wins widely the election. Chitra, a feminist journalist and the only witness of the massacre, tries to take revenge with the help of Dharma.

Cast 
Karthik as Dharma
Pallavi as Chitra
Sathyajith as K. Balasubramaniyam
R. P. Viswam
Livingston
Kumarimuthu
Khaja Sharif
Prabhu in a guest appearance
Rekha in a guest appearance

Production 
According to Kumar, Irumbu Pookkal was "chopped mercilessly" by the censor board.

Soundtrack 
The music composed by Ilaiyaraaja and M. S. Viswanathan.

References

External links 
 

1990s Tamil-language films
1991 crime films
1991 films
Censored films
Films directed by G. M. Kumar
Films scored by Ilaiyaraaja
Films scored by M. S. Viswanathan
Indian crime films